Sam Ngam is a district (amphoe) in the northwestern part of Phichit province, central Thailand.

History
Originally Sam Ngam was a tambon of Tha Luang district. On 1 March 1939 the government separated Tambons Sam Ngam, Rang Nok, Wang Chik, Phai Rop, Ban Na, and Noen Po from Mueang Phichit District, Kamphaeng Din and Hat Kruat from Bang Krathum district, Phitsanulok province to establish the new district, Sam Ngam. Later in 1943 Tambon Wang Chik and Phai Rop were assigned to  Pho Prathap Chang District.

Geography
Neighboring districts are (from the east clockwise) Mueang Phichit, Pho Prathap Chang of Phichit Province, Bueng Samakkhi, Sai Thong Watthana, Sai Ngam of Kamphaeng Phet province, Wachirabarami of Phichit Province, Bang Rakam and Bang Krathum of Phitsanulok province.

Administration

Central administration 
Sam Ngam is divided into five sub-districts (tambons), which are further subdivided into 80 administrative villages (mubans).

Missing numbers are districts which now form Wachirabarami District.

Local administration 
There are three sub-district municipalities (thesaban tambons) in the district:
 Kamphaeng Din consisting of parts of sub-district Kamphaeng Din.
 Sam Ngam consisting of parts of sub-district Sam Ngam.
 Noen Po consisting of sub-district Noen Po.

There are four sub-district administrative organizations (SAO) in the district:
 Sam Ngam consisting of parts of sub-district Sam Ngam.
 Kamphaeng Din consisting of parts of sub-district Kamphaeng Din.
 Rang Nok consisting of sub-district Rang Nok.
 Nong Sano consisting of sub-district Nong Sano.

References

External links
amphoe.com

Sam Ngam